Cailín Áine Ní Toibín (born 25 February 1994) is an Irish beauty pageant titleholder who was crowned Miss Universe Ireland 2017 on 31 August 2017. She represented Ireland at Miss Universe 2017.

Pageantry

Miss Universe Ireland 2015

Prior to her victory in Miss Universe Ireland 2017, Cailín Áine Ní Toibín was crowned Miss Universe Cork in 2015. She would then place as 2nd Runner-up in Miss Universe Ireland 2015, losing to Joanna Cooper.

Miss Universe Ireland 2017
Toíbin was crowned Miss Universe Ireland 2017.

Miss Universe 2017 
Toíbin represented Ireland at the Miss Universe 2017 in Las Vegas, Nevada where she was one of the semi-finalist Top 16 & was one of the continental winner from Europe (Top 4).

References

Irish beauty pageant winners
Irish female models
Miss Universe 2017 contestants
1994 births
Living people
People from Cobh
Beauty pageant contestants from Ireland